Yang Shuyu (born 6 March 2002) is a Chinese basketball player for Inner Mongolia Women's Basketball Team. She competed in the 2020 Summer Olympics.

References

2002 births
Living people
Sportspeople from Guangzhou
Chinese women's basketball players
3x3 basketball players at the 2020 Summer Olympics
Olympic 3x3 basketball players of China
Chinese women's 3x3 basketball players
Medalists at the 2020 Summer Olympics
Olympic bronze medalists for China
Olympic medalists in 3x3 basketball
21st-century Chinese women